Marty Lees is an American college baseball coach and former player.  Lees was the head coach of the Washington State Cougars from 2016 to 2019.

Playing career
Lees attended Lakeview High School in Lakeview, Oregon, where he was a member of the baseball and basketball teams. Upon graduation from Lakeview, Lees enrolled at Lane Community College, where he continued his baseball and basketball career. Lees then went on to Western Oregon University, where he continued his baseball career.

Coaching career
From 1998 to 1999, Lees was the head coach of Oakridge High School in Oakridge, Oregon. In 2000, Lees became the head coach for Harrisburg. Lees also coached the girls' basketball team at Harrisburg. Lees joined the Oregon State Beavers baseball program in 2002 as a volunteer assistant, while still coaching at Harrisburg. Lees was promoted to a full-time assistant coach in 2004. Lees coached third base and instructed base runners. The Beavers won back-to-back College World Series in 2006 and  2007.

On June 25, 2012, Lees left Oregon State for an associate head coaching position with the Oklahoma State Cowboys baseball program. Lees helped the Cowboys to 3 straight NCAA Regional trips, including a Super Regional trip in 2014.

On June 3, 2015, Lees was announced as the head coach of Washington State Cougars baseball. He was fired May 21, 2019 after compiling a record of 68–133–2.

In June 2019, Lees returned to Oklahoma State as an assistant.

Head coaching record

References

External links
Washington State Cougars bio

Living people
Lane Titans baseball players
Lane Titans men's basketball players
Western Oregon Wolves baseball players
High school baseball coaches in the United States
Oregon State Beavers baseball coaches
Oklahoma State Cowboys baseball coaches
Washington State Cougars baseball coaches
People from Lakeview, Oregon
Baseball players from Oregon
American men's basketball players
Year of birth missing (living people)